Titser (International title: The Teacher) is a 2013 Philippine television drama series broadcast by GMA News TV. Directed by Alvin Yapan, it stars Lovi Poe in the title role. It premiered on August 11, 2013. The series concluded on October 13, 2013 with a total of 10 episodes.

The series is streaming online on YouTube.

Cast and characters

Lead cast
 Lovi Poe as Michelle Maturan

Supporting cast
 Mara Lopez as Rosa
 Agot Isidro as Sandra
 Irma Adlawan as May Deroca
 Gardo Versoza as Gil
 Rocco Nacino as Joseph Santiago
 Mikael Daez as Kurt Reyes
 Carl Guevarra as Neil

Episodes

References

External links
 

2013 Philippine television series debuts
2013 Philippine television series endings
Filipino-language television shows
GMA Integrated News and Public Affairs shows
GMA News TV original programming
Philippine drama television series
Television shows set in the Philippines